Fresno County Rural Transit Agency (FCRTA) is the primary bus agency providing intra- and inter-city routes for smaller cities and unincorporated rural communities in Fresno County, California since 1979, including Coalinga, Firebaugh, Fowler, Huron, Kerman, Kingsburg, Mendota, Orange Cove, Reedley, Sanger, San Joaquin, and Selma. FCRTA riders may transfer to Fresno Area Express service within the county seat of Fresno, and FCRTA has additional transfer points connecting to neighboring agencies in Fresno, Kings, and Tulare counties, including Clovis Transit Stageline, Kings Area Regional Transit, and Dinuba Connection.

History 
Fresno County adopted a Regional Transportation Plan in March 1975, which provided a goal of establishing public transit service throughout the county by 1995, including demand responsive service in the small incorporated cities and four inter-city fixed routes:
 Firebaugh–Mendota–Kerman (implemented as Westside Transit)
 Kingsburg–Selma–Fowler (implemented as Southeast Transit)
 Orange Cove–Reedley–Parlier–Sanger (implemented as Orange Cove Inter-city Transit)
 Coalinga–Huron–Riverdale–Caruthers–Easton (implemented as Coalinga Inter-city Transit)

The Fresno County Rural Transit Agency was formed under a joint powers authority agreement signed on September 27, 1979, by the rural incorporated cities in Fresno County (Coalinga, Firebaugh, Fowler, Huron, Kerman, Kingsburg, Mendota, Orange Cove, Reedley, Sanger, San Joaquin, and Selma) and the County of Fresno. While FCRTA is the overall operator which is responsible for funding and planning the system, day-to-day operations are delegated to local agencies or their contracted providers.

Sub-systems 
FCRTA's local operations are carried out by the following sub-system operators:

Notes

Governance 
FCRTA is governed by a board of directors drawn from elected officials in the cities it serves, in addition to one member of the Fresno County Board of Supervisors.

Services 
Virtually all intra-city services are operated on weekdays only as demand responsive services. A few locations offer Saturday intra-city services, including Del Rey, Kingsburg, Reedley, Sanger, and Selma. Most inter-city and inter-community services operate as deviated fixed routes.

Fares 
Fares vary depending on the type of service and distance traveled. Intra-city fares range from free (for qualified individuals) to $0.75, one-way. Inter-city fares range from $0.75 to $6.00, one-way, depending on distance. Some sub-systems offer discounted monthly passes.

Transfers 
FCRTA connects to Fresno Area Express on certain inter-city routes at stops in downtown Fresno. Many of the same routes also stop at the Fresno Santa Fe train station, which is a stop for both Amtrak San Joaquins trains and Greyhound Lines bus service.

Fleet 
The transit fleet used primarily cutaway passenger vans powered by unleaded gasoline and CNG; in addition, there are several larger (21 to 33 passengers) battery-electric buses from Proterra and BYD.

References

External links 

Public transportation in the San Joaquin Valley Area
Bus transportation in California
Public transportation in Fresno County, California
Transit agencies in California